The Walter Vega was a five-cylinder, air-cooled, radial engine for aircraft use, built in Czechoslovakia in the late 1920s.

Applications
 Aero A.34
 ANBO V
 Avia BH-11
 Couzinet 22
 Pander E85
 PWS-8

Specifications

See also

References

 
 Němeček, Václav (1968). Československá letadla (1918-1945), pages 368, Praha: Naše vojsko.
 Walter Vega
 Foreign engines at Olympia (Flight 1929, July 25, p. 778)
 Polish PWS 8 biplane, with Walter "Vega" engine (Flight 1930, August 8, p. 888)

Aircraft air-cooled radial piston engines
1920s aircraft piston engines
Vega